Endless is a British private equity firm. It is headquartered at 3 Whitehall Quay, Leeds, with an office at 102 Park Street, London W1.

In 2017, Endless bought Jones Bootmaker, saving 840 jobs according to BBC. Endless has also invested in West Cornwall Pasty Company, Crown Paints, and Theo Fennell. In April 2006, the firm acquired GlynWebb, which it sold on four months later. In March 2011, Endless acquired T. J. Hughes for an undisclosed sum.

In July 2017, the firm bought the luggage company Antler Luggage from fellow private equity firm Lloyds Development Capital (LDC). In July 2018, it announced that The Works, which it bought out of administration (rescued from insolvency) in May 2008 for around £17 million, would have an IPO, and a valuation of £100 million.

In 2019, Endless acquired Victoria Plum.

References

External links

Private equity firms of the United Kingdom
Financial services companies based in London
Financial services companies established in 2005
2005 establishments in England